Oshane is a village in Vidin Province in northwestern Bulgaria. It is located in the municipality of Belogradchik. It is located near a lake and a river runs through it. At five kilometers is the Magura Cave.

Honours
Oshane Glacier on Brabant Island, Antarctica is named after the village.

References

Villages in Vidin Province
Belogradchik Municipality